"Talk About It" is a song by Australian band, Boom Crash Opera. The song was released in June 1990 as the fifth and final single from their second studio album, These Here Are Crazy Times! (1989).

Track listing
 Maxi
 "Talk About It!" (Iovine Version) - 4:40
 "Great Wall" (Live) - 4:04
 "Piece of the Pie" (Live) - 4:40
 "Ordinary Heaven" - 3:20
 "Talk About It!" (Pleasance Version) - 4:02

 Tracks 2, 3 were recorded live at Festival Hall (Melbourne).

 7" 
 "Talk About It!" (Iovine Version) - 4:40
 "Talk About It!" (Pleasance Version) - 4:02

Charts

References

External links 
Boom Crash Opera website

1989 songs
1990 singles
Boom Crash Opera songs
Songs written by Richard Pleasance